Eliot or Elliott Lewis may refer to:

Elliott Lewis (politician) (1858–1935), Australian premier of Tasmania
Elliott Lewis (actor) (1917–1990), American actor, writer and director
Eliot Lewis (born 1962), American singer, musician, songwriter, and producer